Craiova (also), is Romania's 7th largest city and capital of Dolj County, situated near the east bank of the river Jiu in central Oltenia. It is a longstanding political center, and is located at approximately equal distances from the Southern Carpathians (north) and the River Danube (south). Craiova is the chief commercial city west of Bucharest and the most important city of Oltenia. The city prospered as a regional trading centre despite an earthquake in 1790, a plague in 1795, and a Turkish assault in 1802 during which it was burned.

Eight villages are administered by the city: Făcăi, Mofleni, Popoveni, Șimnicu de Jos, Cernele, Cernelele de Sus, Izvoru Rece, and Rovine. The last four were a separate commune called Cernele until 1996, when they were merged into the city.

Etymology and names
There are two possible etymologies for Craiova: Old Slavonic kral ("king"), which has been borrowed in Romania as crai and Slavonic krajina ("border" or "edge"). Since no source prior to 1475 mentions the city, it is impossible to tell which of the two words is the real etymology. The name is probably of Bulgarian origin, due to historical autochthonous minorities in the area. 

History

Craiova, which occupied the site of the Dacian and Roman city Pelendava, was formerly the capital of Oltenia. Its ancient bans, the highest ranking boyars of the Wallachian state, were initially those of the Craiovești family. The bans had the right of minting coins stamped with their own effigies – the origin of the Romanian word ban as used for coins.

The economic power of the Craiovești family at the end of the 16th century was about 100 villages (182 financial goods). This power gave them a statute of political autonomy so big, that the hospodars ruling at that time were not able to keep in power without an alliance with this powerful dynasty. From the Craiovești family there were chosen a lot of hospodars to rule the country: Neagoe Basarab, Radu de la Afumați, Radu Șerban (1602–1611), Matei Basarab, Constantin Șerban, Șerban Cantacuzino, Constantin Brâncoveanu.

In 1395 Craiova was probably the scene of a victory won by the Wallachian Prince Mircea I of Wallachia over Bayezid I, Sultan of the Ottomans (see Battle of Rovine). 

Frequently referred to as "a city" after the first half of the 16th century, the Craiova area was always regarded as an important economic region of Wallachia and Romania at large. During the 1718–1739 Habsburg occupation of Oltenia (see Banat of Craiova), Craiova's status declined due to economic pressures and increased centralism, partly leading to an increase in hajduk actions, in parallel with protests of Craiovan boyars. In 1761, under Prince Constantine Mavrocordatos, the bans relocated to Bucharest, leaving behind kaymakams to represent them in Craiova.

Under Prince Emanuel Giani Ruset, Wallachia's seat was moved to Craiova (1770–1771), viewed as a place of refuge during the Russo-Turkish War of 1768–1774. A large part of the city was burned down by the rebel pasha Osman Pazvantoğlu in 1800.

During the Wallachian uprising of 1821, inhabitants of the present-day Dolj County joined Tudor Vladimirescu's Pandurs in great numbers, contributing to the expedition on Bucharest. During the first two decades of the 19th century, Craiova witnessed economic prosperity, centered on handicraft trades and public services. During Imperial Russian occupation and the early stages of Organic Statute rules (1828–1834), the city increased its economic output; in 1832 there were 595 shops, 197 of which were made barracks and 398 were houses built of brick. At the time, Craiova exported wheat, furs, leather, live animals and other products into the Austrian and Ottoman Empires.

Costache Romanescu, a citizen of Craiova, was among the leaders of the Provisional Government during the 1848 Wallachian revolution. Wallachia's last two rulers, Gheorghe Bibescu and Barbu Dimitrie Știrbei, came from an important boyar family residing in Craiova – the Bibescu family.

Around 1860, there were 4,633 buildings in Craiova, which were 3,220 houses, 26 churches, 11 schools and 60 factories and workshops. In all, the city also housed about 90 industrial establishments, of which 12 were mills, 3 breweries, 2 gas and oil factories, 4 tanning yards and 2 printing presses; 57% of the total number of craftsmen of Dolj County lived in Craiova (1,088 craftsmen, 687 journeymen and 485 apprentices).

The period following the Independence War was a time of economic and cultural progress. As a result, at the end of the 19th century, the city of Craiova, with its 40,000 inhabitants, had developed small factories (producing chemicals, farming utilities, and construction materials) and textile factories. On October 26, 1896, the Craiova power station entered service (with AEG equipment working at 310 CP, supplying 365 streetlights on 39 streets, forming a 30 km-long network); Craiova was the first city in the country to be supplied with electric power by internal combustion engines.

In 1900, Craiova had 43.1% of the industrial units of Oltenia; these numbered 924 industrial companies (including 20 large industrial establishments, employing 1,078 workers). The number of large industrial establishments rose to 40 by 1925. Banking also developed at the beginning of the 20th century (when 6 banks and 2 bureaux de change were already operating).

In the interwar period, Craiova, as the centre of an agricultural region, experienced little further industrialization; the number of industrial workers remained comparatively small. In 1939, Craiova had 7 industrial units with over 100 workers: the clothing industry companies Oltenia and Scrisul Românesc were well-known all over the country and abroad.  The Treaty of Craiova was signed here on 7 September 1940; under its terms, Romania ceded to Bulgaria the territory of Southern Dobruja, which Romania had gained after the 1913 Second Balkan War.

In the early 1960s, under the Communist regime, the city became a centre for the automotive and engine building industries, as well as for aerospace manufacturing, chemical industry, food industry, construction, electrical engineering, mining and the electrical power industry. The construction of housing estates also begins at this time, with Brazda lui Novac being the one of the first in 1967–1968, followed by Siloz-Valea Roșie in the same years. Later on in the 1980s the Craiovița Nouă, Rovine, 1 Mai, Sărari and Lăpuș-Argeș housing estates are built.

After the 1989 Revolution brought the re-establishment of a free market and decentralisation in overall management, several industries became subject to privatisation, while the market opened itself to private initiatives. Industry, although affected by economic changes, remains an important branch, representing circa 70% of Craiova's output.

Geography

Climate
Craiova has a continental climate with Mediterranean influences, with a July high/low average of 30 °C (86 °F)/18 °C (65 °F) and a January high/low average of 4 °C (39 °F)/-3 °C (26 °F).

Demographics

, 269,506 inhabitants live within the city limits, a decrease from the figure recorded in 2002, making it the sixth most populous city in Romania.
Ethnic composition:
Romanians: 241,176 (89.5%)
Roma: 5,291 (2.0%)
Other: 808 (0.3%)
Data unavailable: 22,231 (8.2%)

Economy

In the first two decades of the 19th century Craiova was characterized by economical growth, multiplication of its inhabitants' preoccupations in the areas of trade, commerce, and public services. In comparison with other great urban centers, Craiova is situated as a commercial, administrative and cultural centre.

During the Tsarist take-over (1828–1834), Craiova goes through important economic growths. In 1832, there were a number of 595 shops, of which "187 of wood and 398 of stone wall". The city is maintained as the commercial centre of Oltenia; it was exporting to Austria and Turkey cereal, skins, wax, animals, tallow and cervices. As a follow-up of the permanent high demands of export, at Craiova was established, in 1846, the first Romanian society on share holds for cereal transport by ship on the Danube, to Brăila.

Around 1860 in Craiova there were 4633 buildings, of which 3220 were houses, 26 churches, 11 schools, 60 factories - workshops. There were also approximately 90 establishments with an industrial character, of which: 12 wind mills, 3 beer factories, 2 gas and oil factories, 4 tanneries, 2 printings. Statistics show that there was, at Craiova, a percent of 57,7% of the total number of craftsmen from the Dolj County (1088 craftsmen, 687 journeymen and 485 apprentices). Towards the ending of the 19th century, Craiova was a city that had small factories and workshops with chemical products, agricultural machines, graphics art, tanneries, textiles, construction materials, etc. Craiova was the first city of the country powered up with electricity based on engines with internal combustion.

In 1900, Craiova was holding 43, 1% of the number of the industrial units of Oltenia, having 924 industrial firms (of which 20 establishments were belonging to the big industry, using 1078 workers). In 1925, the number of establishments of the "big industry" was up to 49, and in 1930 the number of workers was of 5530. The bank commerce was affirming as well, at the beginning of the 20th century already existing 6 banks and 2 exchange offices.

In the Interbelic period, the city, situated in an area eminently agricultural, was moving forward with too small steps toward the industrial way, in comparison with other urban areas of the country. The number of those who got close to industry was extremely small.

In 1939, in Craiova were only 7 industrial units with over 100 workers: the "Oltenia" clothing factory, the "Scrisul Românesc" ("The Romanian Writing") publishing house, the "Concordia" macaroni factory, the "Barbu Druga" bread and macaroni factory, the "Semănătoarea" factory and the "Traiul" bread factory .
The only industrial branch that had industrial units comparable with similar units of other centers of the country was the industry of graphic art. The two printings "Ramuri" and  "Scrisul Românesc" were well known all over the country and abroad.

Starting with the 1960s the city becomes a powerful industrial center; it develops the industry of machine and tools construction, planes, the chemical industry, food industry, easy industry, of construction materials, electro technical, extractive, energetic industry. The Romanian Revolution of 1989 led to important changes in economy, by realizing a free market and by decentralizing the management of all national economic sectors. A value for the property sense was reinstated by liberating the particular initiative and privatization of goods that belonged exclusively to the state.
In industry a drop of all capacity production was noticed, determined by the fact that they couldn't anticipate the direction of the impact of change and size of the shocks that followed the modification of the economical-social system. Still, the industry continues to represent the branch of activity with great influence over the city's economy (70%).

During the post-Revolution period, telecommunication services, banking and insurance, management consulting (CDIMM, Romanian-American Center) began expanding. The number of joint ventures and the value of invested capital at county level have increased to large numbers — Dolj County being the first in respect to these aspects.

Of the city's working population (about 110,000 persons), 38% are employed in industry, 15% in trade and repair services, 10% in transport and storage, 8% in education, 5.7% in the medical field.

Politics 

The Craiova Municipal Council, chosen at the 2020 local election, is made up of 27 councillors, with the following party composition:

Craiova Group 

The Craiova Group, inspired by the Visegrád Group, was founded on 24 April 2015 in Craiova by Romania, Bulgaria and Serbia. Greece later joined to the organization in 2017.

Landmarks

 Madona Dudu Church – built between 1750 and 1756, renovated in 1844, after being destroyed by an 1831 earthquake.  Murals were completed by Gheorghe Tattarescu.
 St. Demetrius Cathedral
 The Church of Coșuna Monastery – the oldest building preserved in Craiova, dating from 1483. 
 Băniei House – the oldest non-religious building that exists in Craiova, dating from 1699. Today it hosts the Museum of Ethnography and Folk Art.
 Craiova Art Museum – the building that houses the museum was built in 1896, following the plans of the French architect Paul Gotereau. Its main attraction is the art gallery dedicated to Constantin Brâncuși, exhibiting six of his early sculptures (including variants of his best-known works)
 Museum of Oltenia – founded in 1915 and divided into three sections: ethnography, history and natural science. The collection is based on donations made in 1908.
 Nicolae Romanescu Park (formerly Bibescu Park) – the largest and most well-known park in Craiova. Through the initiative of Nicolae P. Romanescu, the mayor of Craiova at that time, the park was designed by French architect Émile Rendont. Plans for the park were awarded the gold medal at the 1900 World Fair; work began in 1901 and was completed in 1903.
 Botanical Garden – The garden was laid out by the botanist Alexandru Buia and was opened in 1952.
 Jiu Meadow

Education

The first school in Craiova was founded in 1759 by Constantin Obedeanu. In the spring of 1826 Obedeanu's school took the name Școala Naţională de Limba Română which means National School of Romanian Language. This was the second Romanian high school after Saint Sava high school  in Bucharest (founded in 1818).

Universities:
 University of Craiova
 University of Medicine and Pharmacy

Sport

The first football teams in Craiova appeared in 1921, Craiovan Craiova and Rovine Griviţa Craiova. They merged in 1940, forming a team, FC Craiova, that won the unofficial war championship. Later, another team from the city, Universitatea Craiova, became the first Romanian football team to reach the semi-finals of a European tournament, during the UEFA Cup in 1982-83.

CS Universitatea Craiova – football team
FC U Craiova 1948 – football team
SCM CSU Craiova - Divizia A is a basketball team play in Polyvalent Hall
SCM CSU Craiova - Liga Națională is a handball team play in Polyvalent Hall
SCM U Craiova - Divizia A1 is a volleyball team play in Polyvalent Hall

Transportation

Public transportation in Craiova started in September 1948 with only 2 buses, received from Bucharest. The buses connected the Craiova railway station with the Nicolae Romanescu Park.

The Tram was first introduced in 1987, on an 18, double-track line, as a result of the state's intention of keeping energy consumption low.

The public transport in Craiova today consists of 3 trolley tram lines and 17 bus lines. It is operated by the Regia Autonomă de Transport Craiova (RAT Craiova), a corporation run by City Hall. There are 190 buses and 35 trams serving the city today.

Craiova is also a major railway centre and is connected to all other major Romanian cities, as well as local destinations, through the national Căile Ferate Române network.

There are daily trains with service from Craiova to:
Bucharest (3 hours),
Brașov (6 – 8 hours - via connecting service),
Cluj-Napoca (8 – 10 hours - connecting service),
Sibiu (4 – 7 hours),
Sighișoara (8 – 11 hours - connecting service),
Timișoara ( 5 hours) 

The city is served by Craiova Airport, which has recently been modernised.

International relations

Twin towns — Sister cities

Notable people

Gallery

Notes

References
 Istoria Craiovei, Titu Georgescu, Constantin Barbacioru, Florea Firan, Virgil Joita, Constantin Mocanu, Luchian Deaconu, Ion Dogaru, Editura Scrisul Românesc, 1977
 Florea Firan, Alexandru Firescu, Craiova , Ghidul orașului, Editura Sport-Tourism, 1982
 Documentare statistică privind evoluția economică și socială a municipiului Craiova, Dolj County Statistical Office, 1992

External links

 
Official city website 

 
Populated places in Dolj County
Localities in Oltenia
Cities in Romania
Capitals of Romanian counties
Place names of Slavic origin in Romania